Lightburn is an unincorporated community in Lewis County, West Virginia, United States. Its post office  is closed.

The community was named in honor of Union Army general Joseph Andrew Jackson Lightburn.

References 

Unincorporated communities in West Virginia
Unincorporated communities in Lewis County, West Virginia